The original Western Carolina League was a Class-D circuit in Minor League Baseball which was ideated and created by John Henry Moss. 

The league ran from 1948 to 1952, then combined with the North Carolina State League to form the Tar Heel League in 1953.  

The second Western Carolina League was formed as a Class-A circuit in 1960. After three years, its name was changed to Western Carolinas League.

League Champions

1948–1952
1948 Lincolnton Cardinals
1949 Rutherford County Owls
1950 Lenoir Red Sox
1951 Shelby Farmers
1952 Shelby Farmers

1960–1962
1960 Salisbury Braves
1961 Shelby Colonels
1962 Statesville Owls

Cities represented

1948–1952
Forest City, NC: Forest City Owls (1948)
Gastonia, NC: Gastonia Browns (1950)
Granite Falls, NC: Granite Falls Graniteers (1951)
Hendersonville, NC: Hendersonville Skylarks (1948–1949)
Hickory, NC: Hickory Rebels (1952); moved to the Tar Heel League (1953–1954)
Lenoir, NC: Lenoir Red Sox (1948–1951); moved from the Blue Ridge League (1946–1947)
Lincolnton, NC: Lincolnton Cardinals (1948–1952); moved to the Tar Heel League (1953)
Marion, NC: Marion Marauders (1948–1952); moved to the Tar Heel League (1953–1954)
Morganton, NC: Morganton Aggies (1948–1952)
Newton, NC and Conover, NC: Newton-Conover Twins (1948–1951)
Shelby, NC: Shelby Farmers (1948–1952)
Spindale, NC: Rutherford County Owls (1949–1952)

1960–1962
See Western Carolinas League

Sources
 Holaday, Chris (2006). Professional Baseball in North Carolina: An Illustrated City-by-city History, 1901–1996. Mcfarland & Company, Inc. 
 Baseball Reference – Western Carolina League (Class D) Encyclopedia and History

Baseball leagues in North Carolina
Defunct minor baseball leagues in the United States